Kirinyaga University is a public university situated in Kutus Kerugoya in Kirinyaga County, Kenya.

History
The university has its roots in the Kirinyaga Technical Institute. In 2012 it became a constituent college of the Jomo Kenyatta University of Agriculture and Technology and was renamed Kirinyaga University College. In October 2016 the university was granted the charter to operate as administratively independent university by the president of Kenya Uhuru Kenyatta among eight other universities. After becoming chartered, senior counsel Fred Ojiambo was appointed as chancellor and Prof. Mary Ndung'u as vice chancellor.

Schools
Kirinyaga University has five faculties:
 School of Health Sciences
 School of Pure and Applied Sciences
 School of Hospitality and Textile Technology
 School of Engineering and Technology
 School of Business and Education

References

External links
 Official website
 Library website
 Students website
 KUCCPS Admission portal
 Masomo Portals portal

Kirinyaga University
Universities and colleges in Kenya
Kirinyaga County
Education in Central Province (Kenya)